"Build It Better" is a song by Australian singer-songwriter Natalie Imbruglia, released on 18 June 2021 as the lead single from her sixth studio album Firebird.

Natalie said the song is about "surrendering to the chaos and seeing what's on the other side of it is a good life lesson. Letting something fall apart, and being okay with that, is something that I have had to do in my life, numerous times, but especially moving into this record and becoming a mum. So, I'm really excited about that song, and about the video, which is total escapist fun – the world needs that right now."

Music video
The music video was released on 18 June 2021. The video brings a touch of La La Land to a petrol station in Aylesford, with Natalie singing about having a positive outlook when things fall apart.

Reception
Jackson Langford from Music Feeds called it "one stomper of a bop, with glory-filled acoustic guitar and electrifying piano that helps radiate the same type of optimism Imbruglia sings about." scenestr described the song as "instantly-catchy". Quentin Harrison from Albumism said "'Build It Better' is a gorgeous kickoff to this new project and confirms that changing industry standards and trends aside, Imbruglia is always en vogue."

Charts

References

2021 singles
Natalie Imbruglia songs
Songs written by Natalie Imbruglia
Songs written by Fiona Bevan
2021 songs